The swimming competitions at the 2015 CPISRA World Games took place from 13 to 15 August at the Harvey Hadden Complex in a 25m Pool.

Overview

Results - Finals

13 August 2015 - Session Two Finals

Men's S6-S7 100m Backstroke
EVENT 108 FINAL OF EVENT 101 Men's S6-S7 100m Backstroke
Category S6

Category S7

Men's S8-S10 100m Backstroke
EVENT 109 FINAL OF EVENT 101 Men's S8-S10 100m Backstroke
Category S8

Category S9

Category S10

Women's S6-S7 100m Backstroke
EVENT 110 FINAL OF EVENT 102 Women's S6-S7 100m Backstroke
Category S6

Category S7

Women's S8-S10 100m Backstroke
EVENT 111 FINAL OF EVENT 102 Women's S8-S10 100m Backstroke
Category S9

Mixed S4-S5 50m Backstroke
EVENT 112 FINAL OF EVENT 103 Mixed S4-S5 50m Backstroke
MEN'S - Category S4

MEN'S - Category S5

WOMEN'S - Category S5

Men's SM6-SM7 200m Individual Medley
EVENT 113 FINAL OF EVENT 104 Men's SM6-SM7 200m Individual Medley
Category SM6

Category SM7

Men's SM8-SM9 200m Individual Medley
EVENT 114 FINAL OF EVENT 104 Men's SM8-SM9 200m Individual Medley
Category SM8

Category SM9

Women's SM6-SM8 200m Individual Medley
EVENT 115 FINAL OF EVENT 105 Women's SM6-SM8 200m Individual Medley
Category SM6

Category SM7

Category SM8

Men's S4-S7 50m Freestyle
EVENT 116 FINAL OF EVENT 106 Men's S4-S7 50m Freestyle
Category S4

Category S5

Category S6

Category S7

Men's S8-S10 50m Freestyle
EVENT 117 FINAL OF EVENT 106 Men's S8-S10 50m Freestyle
Category S8

Category S9

Category S10

Women's S5-S6 50m Freestyle
EVENT 118 FINAL OF EVENT 107 Women's S5-S6 50m Freestyle
Category S5

Category S6

Women's S7-S9 50m Freestyle
EVENT 119 FINAL OF EVENT 107 Women's S7-S9 50m Freestyle
Category S7

Category S8

Category S9

14 August 2015 - Session Four

Men's S6-S7 400m Freestyle
EVENT 208 FINAL OF EVENT 201 Men's S6-S7 400m Freestyle
Category S6

Category S7

Men's S8-S10 400m Freestyle
EVENT 209 FINAL OF EVENT 201 Men's S8-S10 400m Freestyle
Category S8

Category S9

Category S10

Women's S6-S7 400m Freestyle
EVENT 210 FINAL OF EVENT 202 Women's S6-S7 400m Freestyle
Category S6

Category S7

Women's S8-S9 400m Freestyle
EVENT 211 FINAL OF EVENT 202 Women's S8-S9 400m Freestyle
Category S8

Category S9

203 Mixed S5 200m Freestyle
EVENT 212 FINAL OF EVENT 203 Mixed S5 200m Freestyle
MEN'S - Category S5

WOMEN'S - Category S5

Men's S8-S9 100m Butterfly
EVENT 213 FINAL OF EVENT 204 Men's S8-S9 100m Butterfly
Category S8

Category S9

Women's S8-S9 100m Butterfly
EVENT 214 FINAL OF EVENT 205 Women's S8-S9 100m Butterfly
Category S9

Men's S5-S6 50m Butterfly
EVENT 215 FINAL OF EVENT 206 Men's S5-S6 50m Butterfly
Category S5

Category S6

Men's S7 50m Butterfly
EVENT 216 FINAL OF EVENT 206 Men's S7 50m Butterfly
Category S7

Women's S6-S7 50m Butterfly
EVENT 217 FINAL OF EVENT 207 Women's S6-S7 50m Butterfly
Category S6

Category S7

15 August 2015 - Session Six

Men's SB5-SB6 100m Breaststroke
EVENT 305 FINAL OF EVENT 301 Men's SB5-SB6 100m Breaststroke
Category SB5

Category SB6

Men's SB7-SB9 100m Breaststroke
EVENT 306 FINAL OF EVENT 301 Men's SB7-SB9 100m Breaststroke
Category SB7

Category SB8

Category SB9

Women's SB5-SB6 100m Breaststroke
EVENT 307 FINAL OF EVENT 302 Women's SB5-SB6 100m Breaststroke
Category SB5

Category SB6

Women's SB7-SB8 100m Breaststroke
EVENT 308 FINAL OF EVENT 302 Women's SB7-SB8 100m Breaststroke
Category SB7

Category SB8

Men's S4-S6 100m Freestyle
EVENT 309 FINAL OF EVENT 303 Men's S4-S6 100m Freestyle
Category S4

Category S5

Category S6

Men's S7-S8 100m Freestyle
EVENT 310 FINAL OF EVENT 303 Men's S7-S8 100m Freestyle
Category S7

Category S8

Men's S9-S10 100m Freestyle
EVENT 311 FINAL OF EVENT 303 Men's S9-S10 100m Freestyle
Category S9

Category S10

Women's S5-S6 100m Freestyle
EVENT 312 FINAL OF EVENT 304 Women's S5-S6 100m Freestyle
Category S5

Category S6

Women's S7 100m Freestyle
EVENT 313 FINAL OF EVENT 304 Women's S7 100m Freestyle
Category S7

Women's S8-S9 100m Freestyle
EVENT 314 FINAL OF EVENT 304 Women's S8-S9 100m Freestyle
Category S8

Category S9

See also

References

External links
 CPISRA World Games Nottingham 2015
 CPISRA World Games 2015 Results Final (pdf)
 Cerebral Palsy International Sports & Recreation Association (CPISRA)
 International Federation of Cerebral Palsy Football (IFCPF)

2015 CPISRA World Games
CPISRA World Games